Pal Aron (born 1969) is an English television and theatre actor, known for his roles as Adam Osman in Casualty, Brandon Kane in The Bill, 
Jayesh Parekh and  Sonny Dhillon in Coronation Street.

Before professionally acting, he performed with the Theatre of the Unemployed in Birmingham. He was also in the comedy Green Wing, and has performed with the RSC. In January 2008 Aron was cast as Vijay Chohan in the daily hospital drama The Royal Today. He also appeared in The Cup, a BBC Two comedy series in which he plays Dr. Kaskar, a football fanatic parent trying to live his dreams through his footballer son. In April 2012, Aron joined the BBC Radio 4 soap opera The Archers as new junior cricket coach Iftikar "Ifty" Shah. In 2012, he appeared in the Sky1 TV comedy series Stella as Jagadeesh. In 2013, Aron appeared as Bhattie QC in About Time. Then in May 2020, he appeared in an episode of the BBC soap opera Doctors as Dick Starr.

External links 
 
 @Zach74465096 at Twitter

1969 births
Living people
British male television actors
People from Birmingham, West Midlands
British male radio actors
British people of Indian descent